Zemplínska may refer to:

Zemplínska Široká, village and municipality in Michalovce District in the Kosice Region of eastern Slovakia
Zemplínska šírava, dam and lake in eastern Slovakia, near the town of Michalovce
Zemplínska Nová Ves, village and municipality in the Trebišov District in the Košice Region of south-eastern Slovakia
Zemplínska Teplica, village and municipality in the Trebišov District in the Košice Region of eastern Slovakia